"How Can I Help You Say Goodbye" is a song written by Karen Taylor-Good and Burton Banks Collins. It was first recorded by American country music singer Patty Loveless for her 1993 album, Only What I Feel and released in March 1994 as the fourth single. A version by American singer, songwriter, and actress Laura Branigan was released later the same year on her final studio album, Over My Heart, also being released as a single. The song was later included on Branigan's 1995 greatest hits album, The Best of Branigan.

Content
In the three verses, the narrator describes with florid imagery three experiences of loss in her life: moving away from her best friend as a young girl, separating from her husband as an adult, and her mother's death. Each time, in the repeating chorus, her mother seeks to comfort her, asking "how can I help you to say goodbye?"

Background
Loveless' album, "Only What I Feel" had sold over 650,000 copies and had been certified as an RIAA Gold Album.  Sony/Epic was receiving requests from radio stations that this song be released as a single, and in March 1994 it was released.  This song climbed up the charts, reaching #3 in June. It was also nominated for the 1995 Grammy Awards for Best Female Country Vocal Performance and Best Country Song. The accompanying music video was nominated by both the CMA and the ACM as 1995 Video of the Year. The song was also nominated for the Song of the Year at the 12th annual Music City News Country Songwriters Awards in 1994. 

"How Can I Help You Say Goodbye" charted for 20 weeks on the Billboard Hot Country Singles and Tracks chart, reaching No. 3 during the week of June 4, 1994.

Burton Collins, who was an actor at the time, had never written a song before "How Can I Help You Say Goodbye". He told Country Weekly that the title was spoken to him by his grandmother shortly before her death in 1988. After being introduced to Karen Taylor-Good by a mutual friend, he wrote the song with her. Collins said that he and Taylor-Good wrote the song in three hours. 

Loveless told in an 1993 interview, that a letter from Collins gave her the strength to get through the song. "It hit me so hard that I just cried every time I tried to record it. I had a real difficult time just getting through it." The universal power of the song became evident the first time she performed it - for an audience of crusty media types at a convention in New York. "I saw this guy breaking up, sort of rubbing his eyes and trying to control his feelings, and I went up to him after the show and said, 'I didn't mean to make you cry'."

Critical reception

Patty Loveless version
Larry Flick from Billboard wrote that "as she's proven time and time again, Loveless has no equal when it comes to caressing a country lyric. Put her together with a killer ballad like this, and you've got something truly special. A broken heart never sounded so good." Jack Hurst from Chicago Tribune viewed it as "exceptional material" on the album, with "a highly affecting lyric about mileposts of life". Alanna Nash from Entertainment Weekly felt that the singer "reaches her artistic zenith on the soul-rattling ballads", remarking "the enormously involving" "How Can I Help You Say Goodbye". Hoelzle and Smith from the Gavin Report noted, "Patty was apparently so moved by this song that she had a hard time getting through it in the studio. Her final performance carries all that emotion." Jim Abbott from The Sentinel wrote, "By far the most emotional song on the album is "How Can I Help You Say Goodbye", a ballad about how leaving childhood friends, divorce and death affect the relationship between a mother and her daughter."

Laura Branigan version
After Laura Branigan released her version, Larry Flick from Billboard wrote, "Hands down, the most memorable moment from Branigan's 1993 album, Over My Heart, finally gets a shot at radio play. Branigan has rarely packed this kind of emotional punch without raising her voice above a melancholy tone. A tear jerking exploration of death and loss deserves instant acceptance from adult contemporary programmers." Chuck Eddy from Entertainment Weekly said, "Nowadays, Branigan is beating Celine Dion at Dion’s own game", adding that "she’s still rending hearts, especially when she remembers the day her family moved away from her best friend in a ’59 station wagon." Fell and Rufer from the Gavin Report commented, "If there's still such a thing as a "woman's song" this would certainly qualify." They stated that Branigan "takes it to heart with a delicate production that's unique to the format and to the moment." Chuck Campbell from Knoxville News Sentinel felt it should've been a hit, declaring it as "a bit melodramatic (about a dying mother), but delivered with simple grace by Branigan."

Track listing

Charts

Weekly charts

Year-end charts

References

Songs about parting
1994 singles
1993 songs
Patty Loveless songs
Laura Branigan songs
Country ballads
Songs written by Karen Taylor-Good
Song recordings produced by Emory Gordy Jr.
Song recordings produced by Phil Ramone
Epic Records singles
Atlantic Records singles